Lac de Morgnieu is a lake at Ceyzérieu in the Ain department of France. It is located 300 m West of Lac de Chavoley.

External links
   

Morgnieu